Chantal T. Spitz (born 11 November 1954) is a Mā’ohi author and activist.

Biography 
Spitz was born in Papeete, French Polynesia, in 1954. Although raised outside of French Polynesia, after completing her education she returned and now lives in Huahine.

Spitz's work focuses the experiences of indigenous people. She has produced poems, essays, and novels.

Her best-known work, L'Ile des rêves écrasés, is the first ever novel by an indigenous French Polynesian writer. Set in French Polynesia in the time period leading up to the first nuclear tests in the region, it tells the story of several generations of Mā’ohi. Due to its criticisms of the French government, its publication in French Polynesia was polarising. In 2007 it was translated into English by Jean Anderson, as Island of Shattered Dreams, and published by Huia Publishers.

Spitz is a founding member of the literary magazine, Littérama’ohi, a French Polynesian publication that aims to showcase authors from French Polynesia.

Selected works
 L'Ile des rêves écrasés (1991)
 Hombo, transcription d'une biographie (2002)
 Pensées insolentes et inutiles (2006)
 Elles, terre d'enfance (2011)
Cartes postales (2015)

References

Further reading 
 Spitz is featured in Sonia Fassel's book, Poètes de Tahiti (2001).

1954 births
Living people
People from Papeete
People from Huahine
French Polynesian women writers
Tahitian women